Lomatium triternatum is a species of flowering plant in the carrot family known by the common name nineleaf biscuitroot. It is native to western North America from British Columbia to California to Colorado, where it grows in many types of habitat. It is a hairy perennial herb growing up to a meter tall from a taproot. The leaves emerge from the lower part of the stem. Each is generally divided into three leaflets which are each subdivided into three linear leaflike segments. The inflorescence is an umbel of yellow flowers, each cluster on a ray up to 10 centimeters long, altogether forming a flat formation of umbels.

References

External links
Calflora Database: Lomatium triternatum (Lewis's lomatium, Nineleaf biscuitroot)
Jepson Manual eFlora treatment of Lomatium triternatum
USDA Plants Profile for Lomatium triternatum (nineleaf biscuitroot)
Southwest Colorado Wildflowers
UC CalPhotos gallery of v

triternatum
Flora of the Northwestern United States
Flora of Western Canada
Flora of California
Flora of Nevada
Flora of Utah
Flora of the Cascade Range
Flora of the Great Basin
Flora of the Rocky Mountains
Taxa named by John Merle Coulter
Flora without expected TNC conservation status